Kelly Kay Emberg (born July 2, 1959) is an American former model who appeared in the Sports Illustrated Swimsuit Issue and in advertisements for Cover Girl cosmetics, Napier Jewelry, and Calvin Klein.

Career
Emberg was born in Houston, Texas, and attended Stratford High School, where she was a member of the school's female drill team, the Spartanaires. She was a cheerleader in her senior year with partner Kelly Bittner.  She modeled part-time during high school after being "discovered" by Alan Martin, a local photographer in Houston who introduced her to John Casablancas. Casablancas brought her to New York City to join his new agency Elite Model Management, where her print career took off.  She appeared on the covers of Vogue, Harper's Bazaar, Glamour and Cosmopolitan magazines. Her first cover was for British Vogue photographed by Alex Chatelain.  She also appeared numerous times in the Sports Illustrated Swimsuit Issue and in advertisements for Cover Girl cosmetics, Napier Jewelry, and Calvin Klein.

After her modeling career, Emberg attended UCLA for three years studying interior design. She worked for interior designer Michael S. Smith and owns The Cotton Box, with a shop on Melrose Avenue, Los Angeles. Her biggest client is Rod Stewart. Emberg created the interior designs for the guest house on his Los Angeles estate in which Ruby, along with Kimberly and Sean, Stewart's children by Alana Hamilton, live.

Emberg's interest in gardening created her current career as Kelly Emberg: The Model Gardener, in which she provides advice and encourages people to grow their own organic vegetables.

Personal life
Emberg began dating singer Rod Stewart in 1983.  The couple had one child, a daughter, Ruby, born June 7, 1987 in Los Angeles. In the summer of 1990, the couple split. Stewart insisted it was Emberg's decision to break off the relationship: "She had another geezer". He later mentioned in his autobiography the reason for the breakup was due to his continued unfaithfulness and he also met future wife Rachel Hunter. Emberg filed a palimony suit in early 1991, which was settled in 1993 for an undisclosed amount.

References

External links
Kelly Emberg at the Internet Movie Database

1959 births
Living people
Models from Houston
Female models from Texas
UCLA School of the Arts and Architecture alumni
Family of Rod Stewart